Qaranjik-e Gukcheli (also Romanized as Qaranjīk-e Gūgchelī; also known as Qaranjīk-e Gūgjelī) is a village in Jafarbay-ye Sharqi Rural District, Gomishan District, Torkaman County, Golestan Province, Iran. At the 2006 census, its population was 510, in 108 families.

References 

Populated places in Torkaman County